Logorik may be,

Logorik people
Logorik language